James Edward Fitzmorris Jr. (November 15, 1921 – June 30, 2021) was an American politician who served on the New Orleans City Council from 1954 to 1966 and as Lieutenant Governor of Louisiana from 1972 to 1980.

References

1921 births
2021 deaths
Louisiana Democrats
Politicians from New Orleans
Lieutenant Governors of Louisiana
Military personnel from Louisiana
New Orleans City Council members
United States Army personnel of World War II
United States Army officers